The Gaon Album Chart is a record chart that ranks the best-selling albums and EPs in South Korea. It is part of the Gaon Music Chart which launched in February 2010. The data for the chart is compiled by the Ministry of Culture, Sports and Tourism and the Korean Music Content Industry Association based on weekly and monthly physical albums and digital sales by six major distributors: LOEN Entertainment, S.M. Entertainment, Sony Music Korea, Warner Music Korea, Universal Music and Mnet Media.

Overall, EXO's Exodus (korean ver) album was Gaon Album Chart best selling album of 2015, selling 478,856 copies. The group also sold South Korea best-selling album of 2015 with all standard Exodus (korean ver) and each of its reissue Exodus (chinese ver), Love Me Right (korean ver) and Love Me Right (chinese ver) albums selling a total of 1,211,237 units overall. The group won Album of The Year at 2015 Mnet Asian Music Awards, Album of The Year (1st Quarter) and (2nd Quarter) at 5th Gaon Chart Music Awards, Disk Daesang and Disk Bonsang at 30th Golden Disc Awards and Album of The Year at 2015 Melon Music Awards.

Weekly charts

Monthly charts

Notes

References

External links 
 Gaon Charts - Official Website 

2015
Korea, South albums
2015 in South Korean music